Alexander Mieceslaus Zaleski (June 24, 1906 – May 16, 1975) was an American prelate of the Roman Catholic Church. He served as bishop of the Diocese of Lansing in Michigan from 1965 until his death in 1975.  He previously served as an auxiliary bishop of the Archdiocese of Detroit in Michigan from 1950 to 1965.

Biography

Early life 
One of seven children, Alexander Zaleski was born in Laurel, New York, to Anthony and Bertha (née Janulewicz) Zaleski. After graduating from Don Bosco Preparatory High School at Ramsey, New Jersey, in 1924, he attended SS. Cyril and Methodius Seminary in Orchard Lake, Michigan. He went to Leuven, Belgium, in 1927 to study at the American College of Louvain.

Priesthood 
Zaleski was ordained to the priesthood by Archbishop John Gregory Murray  in Leuven on July 12, 1931.  Following his return to Michigan, Zaleski served as a curate at Resurrection Parish in Detroit until 1932, when he was transferred to St. Thomas the Apostle Parish in the same city. In 1935, he returned to Rome to study at the Pontifical Biblical Institute, earning a  Licentiate of Sacred Scripture.

After returning to Michigan in 1935, Zaleski was named to the faculty of SS. Cyril and Methodius Seminary.  He left the seminary in 1937 to become vice-chancellor of the archdiocese.  In 1949, Zaleski was named pastor of St. Vincent de Paul Parish in Pontiac in 1949.  He transferred in 1956 to St. Alphonsus Parish in Dearborn to serve as pastor there. Zaleski was named a domestic prelate in 1946.

Auxiliary Bishop of Detroit 
On March 28, 1950, Zaleski was appointed as auxiliary bishop of the Archdiocese of Detroit and titular bishop of Lyrbe by Pope Pius XII. He received his episcopal consecration on  May 23, 1950, from Cardinal Edward Mooney, with Bishops Stephen Woznicki and Allen Babcock serving as co-consecrators. Zaleski was appointed vicar general of the archdiocese in 1954.  While auxiliary bishop, he continued to serve as pastor at St. Alphonsus.

Coadjutor Bishop and Bishop of Lansing 
Zaleski was named coadjutor bishop of the Diocese of Lansing on October 7, 1964 by Pope Paul VI. Upon the death of Bishop Joseph H. Albers, Zaleski succeeded him as bishop on December 1, 1965. He also served as chairman of the Committee on Doctrine in the United States Conference of Catholic Bishops; in this capacity, he played a prominent role in the censuring of liberal theologian Charles Curran. Zaleski was present at the opening session of the Second Vatican Council.

Death and legacy 
Alexander Zaleski died on May 16, 1975, in Lansing at age 68.

References

1906 births
1975 deaths
Catholic University of Leuven (1834–1968) alumni
American College of the Immaculate Conception alumni
Roman Catholic bishops of Lansing
20th-century Roman Catholic bishops in the United States
Don Bosco Preparatory High School alumni
Participants in the Second Vatican Council
People from Southold (town), New York
SS. Cyril and Methodius Seminary alumni
Pontifical Biblical Institute alumni
Roman Catholic Archdiocese of Detroit
Catholics from New York (state)